

Waterbodies 
Waterbody; Length in km; in Saxony-Anhalt flowing through; (confluence of ...); Remarks

Elbe 
Elbe; 1.091 km; rises in the Giant Mountains of the Czech Republic at a height of ca. 1,386 m, flows through or touches the Czech Republic, Saxony, Saxony-Anhalt, Brandenburg, Lower Saxony, Mecklenburg-Western Pomerania, Hamburg, Schleswig-Holstein

Elbe tributaries and water bodies with their confluence in Saxony-Anhalt
 Aland
 Biese
 Milde
 Uchte
 Augraben
 Havel
 Königsgraben
 Tanger
 Ihle
 Ehle

 Ohre
 Schrote
 Siegrenne
 Sieggraben
 Kreuzgrund
 Faule Renne
 Große Sülze
 Klinke
 Eulengraben
 Großer Wiesengraben
 Kleiner Wiesengraben
 Künette
 Sülze
 Nuthe (Elbe)
 Saale
 Bode
 Selke
 Holtemme
 Kalte Bode
 Hassel
 Brummeckebach
 Sellegraben
 Murmelbach
 Hagenbach
Sautal (left)
 Fuhne
 Strengbach
 Riede
 Wipper (Harz)
 Mühlgraben
 Eine
 Wiebeck
 Leine
 Schwennecke
 Mukarehne
 Langetalbach
 Rote Welle
 Walbke, also known as the Ölgrundbach
 Hadeborn
 Alte Wipper, also known as the Regenbeck
 Stockbach
 Fuchsbach
 Talbach
 Hagenbach
 Ochsenpfuhlbach
 Dorfbach
 Sengelbach
 Brumbach
 Hasselbach
 Schmale Wipper
 Horla
 Wolfsberger Wipper
 Schmale Else
 Schlenze
 Fleischbach
 Lobach
 Rüsterbach
 Grift
 Salza
 Laweke
 Würde
 Querne
 Weida
 Böse Sieben
 Glume
 Wilder Graben
 Wolferoder Bach
 Saugrund
 Pfaffengrund
 Goldgrund
 Kliebigsbach
 Dippelsbach
 Vietsbach/Goldbach
 Götsche
 White Elster
 Gerwische
 Reide
 Geisel
 Unstrut
 Helme
 Rohne
 Westerbach
 Gonna
 Ungeheurer Graben
 Botzemannsgraben
 Heimbach
 Riestedter Bach
 Thyra
 Mulde
 Pelze
 Black Elster

Elbe tributaries and waterbodies with their confluence outside Saxony-Anhalt
 Jeetze
 Salzwedel Dumme
 Wustrower Dumme
 Parnitz

Special rivers 
 Ilse
(via Oker, Aller to the Weser)

Canals 
 Elster-Saale Canal: planned, largely constructed but never completed waterway between the Saale (south of Halle (Saale)) and Leipzig.
 Canal sections in Halle (Saale): planned, partially constructed but never completed canal sections near the Saale as part of the planned but never finished southern arm of the Mittelland Canal.

Standing waterbodies 
Waterbody; Waterbody system; Area in ha; location of the nearest significant settlement; Remarks

The standing waterbodies are sorted by type. Their boundaries are however, somewhat fluid.

Reservoirs and forebays 
 Kelbra Reservoir; Helme, Unstrut, Saale, Elbe; 600 ha; near Kelbra; bathing lake
 Rappbode Reservoir; Bode, Saale, Elbe; 395 ha; near Hasselfelde
 Wendefurth Reservoir; Bode, Hassel, Saale, Elbe; 78.0 ha; near Wendefurth
 Wippra Reservoir; Wipper, Saale, Elbe; 38.5 ha; near Wippra
 Königshütte Reservoir; Bode, Saale, Elbe; 32.0 ha; Königshütte near Wernigerode
 Hassel Forebay; Hassel, Bode, Saale, Elbe; 25.0 ha; near Hasselfelde
 Rappbode Forebay; Bode, Saale, Elbe; 24.3 ha; near Hasselfelde
 Zillierbach Reservoir; Zillierbach, Bode, Saale, Elbe; 23.0 ha; near Wernigerode
 Frankenteich; Rödelbachgraben, Selke (river), Bode, Saale, Elbe; 11.0 ha; near Straßberg in the Harz
 Kiliansteich Reservoir; Büschengraben, Rödelbachgraben, Selke, Bode, Saale, Elbe; 17.3 ha; near Straßberg in the Harz
 Upper Kiliansteich; Büschengraben, Rödelbachgraben, Selke, Bode, Saale, Elbe; 17.3 ha; near Straßberg in the Harz
 Teufelsteich; Teufelsgrundbach, Selke, Bode, Saale, Elbe; 19.9 ha; near Harzgerode
 Birnbaumteich; Birnbaumbach; 4.5 ha; near Neudorf (Harz)
 Gondelteich; Uhlenbach; 4.2 ha; near Friedrichsbrunn
 Großer Siebersteinteich; Siebersteinbach; 4.2 ha; near Ballenstedt
 Bremer Teich; Bach vom Bremer Teich; 3.7 ha; near Gernrode
 Kunstteich Neudorf; unnamed, tributary of the schmalen Wipper, schmale Wipper, Wipper, Saale, Elbe, 4.2 ha; near Neudorf
 Kunstteich Ballenstedt; Garnwinde, Sauerbach; 3 ha; near Ballenstedt
 Fürstenteich; Teufelsbach; 2.5 ha; near Silberhütte	
 Neuer Teich; Hagentalsbach; 2.4 ha; near Gernrode
 Kleiner Siebersteinteich; Siebersteinbach; 1.8 ha; near Ballenstedt
 Bergrat-Müller-Teich; Friedenstalbach; 1.3 ha; near Friedrichsbrunn
 Erichsburger Teich; Friedenstalbach; 1.1 ha; near Harzgerode

Open cast mine lakes 
 Goitzsche; near the Mulde, Elbe; 2500 ha; southeast of Bitterfeld
 Geiseltalsee; Saale, Elbe; 1842 to 1900 ha; south of Halle (Saale); former brown coal open cast mine to 2011 flooded, Original smaller lakes merged: August 2008
 Muldestausee; Mulde, Elbe; 605 ha; east of Bitterfeld
 Concordiasee; flooded until 2015. 600 ha; between Nachterstedt and Schadeleben; bank collapse of 2 million cubic metres on 19 Juli 2009. 3 dead
 Raßnitzer See; White Elster, Saale, Elbe; 310 ha; east of Merseburg; former brown coal open cast mine flooded until 2000, 
 Wallendorfer See; White Elster, Saale, Elbe; 338 ha; east of Merseburg; former brown coal open cast mine flooded until 2000
 Gremminer See; Elbe; 543 ha; west of Gräfenhainichen; former brown coal open cast mine (still flooded) Golpa-Nord, Ferropolis museum and event location 
 Gröberner See; Elbe; 366 ha; east of Gräfenhainichen; former brown coal open cast mine (still flooded) Gröbern
 Barleber See; Elbe; 105 ha; near Magdeburg and Barleben; bathing lake
 Paupitzscher See; Mulde, Elbe; 100 ha; between Bitterfeld and Delitzsch; largest part in Saxony
 Hufeisensee; ca. 70 ha; former brown coal open cast mine and gravel pit in the borough of Halle (Saale)
 Neustädter See; Elbe; 60 ha; near Magdeburg
 Posthornteiche; 2 Teiche; 20 ha and 5 ha; former Braunkohlentiefbau, near Halle (Saale)
 Heidesee; 12.5 ha; former brown coal open cast mine, near Halle (Saale)
 Rattmannsdorfer See; 76 ha; former gravel pit, near Halle (Saale)
 Hohenweidener See; 13 ha; former gravel pit, near Halle (Saale)
 Osendorfer See; 22 ha; former brown coal open cast mine in Halle (Saale)
 Angersdorfer Teiche; 2 Teiche 6 ha and 3 ha; former clay pit, near Halle (Saale)
 Runstedter See; 23 ha former brown coal open cast mine near Braunsbedra
 Bergwitzsee; Elbe; 180 ha; south of Wittenberg near Bergwitz; former brown coal open cast mine, bathing lake
 Adria Gravel Pit; Mulde, Elbe; 12 ha; near Dessau; former gravel pit for motorway construction, bathing lake
 Gerwisch Gravel Lake
 Salbker See 1 and 2 in Magdeburg Southeast (remains of former gravel pits originally several hectares in area )
 Mondsee; ca. 38 ha; near Hohenmölsen; flooded 1989 to 1991

Water management storage 
 Wettelrode Storage Reservoir; Erlbach; 4 ha; west of Wettelrode
 Schmon Storage Reservoir; Schmoner Bach; 2.2 ha; west of Schmon

Retention basins

Partially impounded retention basins 
 Kalte Bode flood retention basin; Bode, Saale, Elbe; 58.9 ha; near Königshütte in the Harz

Normally non-impounded retention basins 
 Stöbnitz Retention Basin; Saale, Elbe; 21.5 ha; northeast of Öchlitz in Merseburg-Querfurt
 Schrote Retention Basin; Elbe; 10.0 ha; west of Magdeburg
 Gleinaer Grund Retention Basin; Geisel; 6.3 ha; southwest of Mücheln

Natural lakes and bogs 

 Arendsee; Elbe; 514 ha; near Arendsee (Altmark); bathing lake
 Süßer See; Saale, Elbe, Böse Sieben, Salza; 247 ha; Seeburg
 Schönitzer See; Elbe; 145 ha; near Riesigk; Altarm der Elbe
 Bindersee; Saale, Elbe; 25 ha; east of Seeburg
 Kernersee; Saale, Elbe; 17 ha; east of Seeburg
 Schönfeld-Kamerner See; Elbe; ?? ha; near Schönfeld, Saxony-Anhalt and Kamern in the Landkreis Stendal
 Lake Niegripp; Elbe; ?? ha; near Niegripp in the Landkreis Jerichower Land
 Salziger See ; Salza; Weida; trockengelegt, near Röblingen am See

Ponds and others 
 Gotthardteich; Geisel; 6.8 ha; near Merseburg
 Grenzteich; schmale Wipper, Wipper, Saale, Elbe; 70 are; near Neudorf
 Lausiger Teiche; Elbe; ?? ha; near Bad Schmiedeberg
 Maliniusteich; Rödelbachgraben, Selke, Bode, Saale, Elbe; near Straßberg in the Harz
 Mensingteich; Hagenbach; 1.1 ha; near Gernrode
 Möllerteich, Graben vom Möllerteich, Büschengraben, Rödelbachgraben, Selke, Bode, Saale, Elbe; between Straßberg and Breitenstein in the Harz
 Mühlenteich; Selke; 7.1 ha; near Güntersberge
 Neudorfer Gemeindeteich; unnamed, tributary of the schmalen Wipper, schmale Wipper, Wipper, Saale, Elbe; 50 a; in Neudorf
 Neudorfer kleiner Teich 1; unnamed, tributary of the schmalen Wipper, schmale Wipper, Wipper, Saale, Elbe; 3 a; near Neudorf
 Neudorfer kleiner Teich 2; unnamed, tributary of the schmalen Wipper, schmale Wipper, Wipper, Saale, Elbe; 22 a; near Neudorf

Canals and ditches 

 Elbe-Havel Canal
 Gnevsdorfer Vorfluter
 Mittelland Canal
 Niegripper Link Canal
 Pareyer Link Canal
 Rothenseer Link Canal
 Schindelbrücher Kunstgraben
 Siebengründer Graben

See also 
 River basin
 Tributary
 Catchment area
 List of rivers in Germany
 List of lakes in Germany

References

External links 
 Water act for the state of  Saxony-Anhalt: Standing waterbodies
 GIS-based information on lake development in central Germany
 Documentation on the condition and development of the most important lakes in Germany by TU Cottbus, Part 7: Saxony-Anhalt (pdf file; 307 kB)

!
Saxony-Anhalt
Water